India - Latvia relations refer to the bilateral relations between India and Latvia. Two countries established diplomatic relations at 1991, following the independence of Latvia. India's mission to Latvia is accredited from the Indian embassy in Stockholm, Sweden; while Latvia maintains an embassy and a consulate in New Delhi.

Economic relations
In 2013, Latvia and India signed an agreement avoiding double taxation, which increased Indian exports to Latvia in term of economic benefits between two nations. Currently two countries are discussing on building a closer and deeper cooperation in transports and logistics.

India sees Latvia, as well as Estonia and Lithuania, as strategic partners of Indian interests in the Baltics.

State visits
In 2017, Latvian Prime Minister Māris Kučinskis visited India to accelerate the development of economic relations between the countries.
In 2019, Indian Vice President Venkaiah Naidu also visited Latvia and held talks with the Latvian leaders.

References

External links
Embassy of India to Sweden and Latvia
EMBASSY OF THE REPUBLIC OF LATVIA IN THE REPUBLIC OF INDIA

 
Latvia
Bilateral relations of Latvia